Elizabeth Shaw is a Bristol-based company that markets chocolate-based confectionery, including the brands Famous Names chocolate liqueurs and Elizabeth Shaw after dinner mints.

The business was founded in 1881, as H.J. Packer, in Armoury Square, Bristol, but, having outgrown its original premises, moved to a newly built factory in Greenbank, Bristol in 1915. Its fortunes waxed and waned over the next century, being owned by, amongst others, James Goldsmith and James (Lord) Hanson. In 2006, faced with the high costs associated with the 330,000 sq feet building, the company relocated its manufacturing to factories in the UK and in mainland Europe, and closed the then 105-year-old factory.

In March 2006 Elizabeth Shaw was purchased by Nói Síríus, the largest confectionery manufacturer in Iceland. It was subsequently purchased by a Norwegian company, Imagine Capital. In 2016, Colian Holding, Poland's largest confectionery manufacturer, acquired Elizabeth Shaw from Imagine Capital.

Greenbank factory site
Local residents successfully argued against redevelopment of the closed factory into flats and houses. The building, in the eyes of local residents, represented part of the industrial heritage of Bristol. The opposition to this redevelopment was supported by George Ferguson, whose vision had earlier turned a defunct tobacco factory in Bedminster into one of Bristol's leading artistic and creative venues, called the Tobacco Factory. However, as of 2012, the building was still standing empty, following the failure of all the parties involved to deliver an acceptable and workable solution for the future use of the building and site. By late 2013 the building had reverted to the Clydesdale Bank and developments were being planned by the Generator Group. More information is held on the current community group website for the chocolate factory (External Links below).
In August 2014, the site's new owners Generator South West look likely to proceed with a new project after holding a public meeting to understand local residents' opinions. The plan is to create open spaces around a development of flats and housing.

As of 2016 there have been many problems surrounding the development of this site, namely that developers Generator South West "have asked to be excused from the legal obligation that between 30 and 40 per cent of any development be social housing, on the basis that the extra costs of restoring old, historic buildings makes the plan economically unviable."

Community action group ACORN are one of the groups campaigning against this back-tracking on the provision of social housing due to the current housing crisis in Bristol and severe lack of social or affordable housing being built. Developers Generator Group worked with Bristol City Council to ensure that 36 shared ownership homes were created alongside the private housing. The first homes to be built for occupation in 2021 are shared ownership.

Archives
Records of Elizabeth Shaw Limited, primarily relating to the Greenbank factory, are held at Bristol Archives. The collection also includes some records of HJ Packers, Carsons Ltd, Cavenham Confectionary Ltd, United Biscuits, Hollands Toffees, and Huhtamäki amongst others which are linked with Elizabeth Shaw Limited (Ref. 43258) (online catalogue).

References

External links

Elizabeth Shaw's web page (History page (archived 2011))
A Short History of the Greenbank Chocolate Factory, John Penny (archived 2016)
Greenbank Factory, Chocolate Memories (archived 2011)
Packer's to LEAF (UK) 1881 – 1991, A Short History of Chocolate Making in Greenbank, Bristol, Living Easton
Elizabeth Shaw Chocolate Factory, Bristol, Whatever's Left, 6 December 2009
Website for the new community group, ChocBox2 with further news of developments on the site
Website for the proposed development by Generator South West
Records of HJ Packer & Co, Carsons Ltd and Elizabeth Shaw Limited

Buildings and structures in Bristol
Confectionery companies of the United Kingdom
Defunct companies based in Bristol
Manufacturing companies based in Bristol